Jorge Ortíz (born 7 November 1954) is a Puerto Rican sprinter. He competed in the men's 4 × 400 metres relay at the 1976 Summer Olympics.

References

1954 births
Living people
Athletes (track and field) at the 1976 Summer Olympics
Athletes (track and field) at the 1979 Pan American Games
Puerto Rican male sprinters
Puerto Rican male middle-distance runners
Olympic track and field athletes of Puerto Rico
Place of birth missing (living people)
Pan American Games competitors for Puerto Rico